St. John's Church is an Anglican church, now under the Church of Pakistan, located in Jhelum cantonment, Pakistan, beside the river Jhelum.

History
It was built in 1860 and is a landmark of the city. It is a Protestant church and was in use during the British colonial period. For forty years it remained closed, but has been renovated and reopened.

On 7 July 1857, 35 British soldiers of the 24th Regiment of Foot were killed by mutineers in Jhelum during the Indian Rebellion of 1857. Among the dead was Captain Francis Spring, the eldest son of Colonel William Spring. The church was built to commemorate the eventual British victory in the rebellion, and a lectern now stands in the church as a memorial to the dead British soldiers.

References

Jhelum
Church of Pakistan church buildings in Pakistan
1860 establishments in British India
Tourist attractions in Jhelum